Aurel Foiciuc (born 12 July 1967) is a Romanian alpine skier. He competed in five events at the 1992 Winter Olympics.

References

1967 births
Living people
Romanian male alpine skiers
Olympic alpine skiers of Romania
Alpine skiers at the 1992 Winter Olympics
Place of birth missing (living people)